Emad Abu Ghazi (born 3 January 1955) is an Egyptian professor of archival studies at the University of Cairo, who is one of the Egypt's former ministers of culture. He has also worked as the secretary general of the supreme council of culture in Egypt.

Early life and education
Abu Ghazi was born in the Egyptian city of Cairo in 1955. His parents were former minister of culture Badr Al Din Abu Ghazi and artist Reaya Helmi. His father's uncle was Egypt's leading sculptor Mahmoud Mokhtar. 

He graduated from El-Kawmeya school then entered the faculty of arts in the University of Cairo, where he specialized in archival studies. He received his bachelor's degree in 1982, his master's degree in 1988 and his doctorate in 1995.

References

1955 births
Living people
Academic staff of Cairo University
Culture ministers of Egypt
Politicians from Cairo